The 2011–12 Arizona Wildcats men's basketball team represented the University of Arizona during the 2011–12 NCAA Division I men's basketball season. The Wildcats, led by third-year head coach Sean Miller, played their home games at the McKale Center and were members of the Pac-12 Conference. They finished with 23–12 overall, 12–6 in pac-12 play. They lost the championship game of the 2012 Pac-12 Conference men's basketball tournament by Colorado which hurt their chances to qualify for the 2012 NCAA Division I men's basketball tournament, instead they were invited to the 2012 National Invitation Tournament which they lost in the first round by Bucknell.

Departures

Recruits

Roster

 March 7, 2012 – Josiah Turner was suspended indefinitely from the basketball team for a violation of team rules.

Depth chart

Schedule

|-
!colspan=9 style="background:#; color:white;"| Exhibition

|-
!colspan=9 style="background:#; color:white;"| Non-conference regular season

|-
!colspan=9 style="background:#;"|  Pac-12 regular season

|-
!colspan=9 style="background:#;"| Pac-12 Tournament

|-
!colspan=9 style="background:#;"| NIT

Rankings

References

Arizona Wildcats
Arizona Wildcats men's basketball seasons
Arizona
Arizona Wildcats
Arizona Wildcats